The State Council Information Office (SCIO) is the chief information office of the State Council of the People's Republic of China and an external name of the Central Propaganda Department of the Chinese Communist Party.

Historically, SCIO was the external name of the Office of External Propaganda (OEP) of the Chinese Communist Party (CCP) under an arrangement termed "one institution with two names." In 2014, OEP was absorbed into the Central Propaganda Department, turning SCIO into an external nameplate.

History 
The SCIO was formed in 1991 when the CCP Central Committee decided that the External Propaganda Leading Group of the CCP Central Committee should have the name of State Council Information Office externally. The External Propaganda Leading Group was transformed into the Office of External Propaganda (OEP). The office was created with the goal of improving the Chinese government's international image following the 1989 Tiananmen Square protests and massacre. According to scholar Anne-Marie Brady, the SCIO became a separate unit from the CCP Central Propaganda Department but still connected to it and was the "public face of this new direction in foreign propaganda work."

The office formerly had responsibility for internet censorship in China. The SCIO's Internet Affairs Bureau dealt with internet censorship and repressed "disruptive" (anti-Chinese government) activity on the web in mainland China. However, in May 2011, the SCIO transferred the offices which regulated the internet to a new subordinate agency, the Cyberspace Administration of China. In 2014, the OEP was absorbed into the CCP's Central Propaganda Department.

In November 2020, the director of the SCIO, Xu Lin, gave a speech in which he emphasized the need to "resolutely guard against digitalisation diluting the party’s leadership, resolutely prevent the risk of capital manipulating public opinion."

List of directors 
 Zhu Muzhi, 1991–1992
 Zeng Jianhui, 1992–1998
 Zhao Qizheng, 1998–2005
 Cai Wu, 2005–2008
 Wang Chen, 2008–2013
 Cai Mingzhao, March 2013 – December 2014
 Jiang Jianguo, January 2015 – August 2018
 Xu Lin, August 2018 – 9 June 2022
 Sun Yeli, 17 January 2023 – Incumbent

References

External links 

  

State Council of the People's Republic of China
Institutions of the Central Committee of the Chinese Communist Party
Chinese propaganda organisations
One institution with multiple names